Chu Chin-peng (born 14 September 1963) is a Taiwanese politician. He was the Minister of the Research, Development and Evaluation Commission of the Executive Yuan from 2009 to 2012.

Education
Chu obtained his bachelor's degree in German Language and Literature from Fu Jen Catholic University in 1986 and master's degree in law from Tamkang University in 1988. He then pursued his doctoral degree at Justus-Liebig University in Germany and obtained his degree in 1995.

Personal life
Chu is married with one son.

References

1963 births
Living people
Political office-holders in the Republic of China on Taiwan
Fu Jen Catholic University alumni